The Buzurgo Ka Humsafar or the  "Companion of the Elderly" campaign in India started in 2012 by a group of allopathic family physicians from Surat, Gujarat in which they prioritise geriatric care to educate the elderly population about the care needed in the later years of life.

The "Buzurgo Ka Humsafar" Campaign is parented under the Family Physicians' Association Surat which is an extension of the unit of the Federation Of Family Physicians' Associations of India.

Their end goal is to solve the health and socioeconomic hurdles of elderly people.

History 

Dr. Jayendra Kapadia, Dr. Deepak Torawala and Dr. Vinod C Shah started the medical education and Social Awareness program independently in the year 2012. They later felt the need to scale up the project as many elderly people were unaware on the basics of medical education and socioeconomic issues related to health. They then approached the Family Physicians’ Association of Surat which is a unit of Federation of Family Physicians’ Associations of India. The "Buzurgo Ka Humsafar" program then came under the banner of Family Physicians’ Association of Surat in the year 2013.

Sub-Campaigns

Adult Vaccination Camps 
The Family Physicians' Association spreads awareness on the importance and benefits of adult vaccination to the elderly group of people. They provide scientific and evidence-based information on vaccines of Pneumonia, Influenza, Hepatitis A, Hepatitis B, Tdap, Typhoid, Meningitis, Herpes zoster and many more

Medical diagnostic and Therapeutic Camps 
The team of doctors of "Buzurgo ka Humsafar" organise medical and therapeutic camps in the remote and interior parts of South Gujarat where people are often underprivileged in medical education.

Medical Education and Social Awareness Workshops 

The Medical Education and Social Awareness Workshops are carried out in the metro cities, towns and remote areas. These workshops have been carried out in parts of Gujarat, Maharashtra, Madhya Pradesh, Rajasthan and Karnataka. In these workshops the doctors impart knowledge on diseases like Cataract, Breast cancer, Osteoporosis, Osteoarthritis, Prostatic Hypertrophy, Cardiovascular disease, Endocrine diseases, High blood pressure, Diabetes, Renal Diseases, Demensia etc.. During the time of COVID pandemic the team of doctors conducted several online workshops. The workshops were attended by residents of US as well as Canada. They also help the elderly population with socio-economical issues like how to prepare a WILL, sleeping habits, importance of nutrition in elderly people and handling conflicts within the family.

Surmayee Safar 
The Surmayee Safar sub-campaign is a musical bonanza to the elderly group of people based on the ideology "Music is the way of life!". The Surmayee Safar program targets to relieve the elderly of stress and anxiety and elevate the frame of mind through the music of their era. The Surmayee Safar program is extremely popular amongst the senior citizen demographic.

References 

Community Service
Medical Association